The  evaluates one's knowledge of kanji.

There are 12 levels (levels 10 through 3, pre-2, 2, pre-1 and 1) with level 10 being the easiest and level 1 the most difficult. The test examines not only one's ability to read and write kanji, but also one's ability to understand their meanings, to use them correctly in sentences, and to identify their correct stroke order. Although the test was originally developed for native Japanese speakers, non-native speakers may also take the tests and pass it.

Native speakers pass levels 10 through 7 at better than an 80% rate, whereas level 1 is so difficult that fewer than two thousand people take it each time it is offered, and fewer than 20% of those pass.

For levels 10 through 8, the test is 40 minutes long; for levels 7 through 1, it is 60 minutes long. A minimal score of 70% is required to pass levels 7 through pre-2, and a score of 80% is required for levels 10 through 8, 2, pre-1, and 1.

Levels 10 through 4 are primarily taken by kindergarten to elementary school age (up to 12 years old) children. Levels 3 and above are typically taken by high-school students and adults.

Level 2 is as high as many Japanese, even those with higher education degrees, tend to go. Passing level 2 can be used as leverage when applying for jobs, etc. Passing levels pre-1 and 1 is especially rare even among native speakers.

Test levels and skills

Level 10 
 Pass rate for this level: 95.0% (in 2016-17)
 Tests the 80 kanji learned in the first grade of elementary school (age 7); see Level 10 kanji.
Specifically:
 Tests knowledge of proper readings of kanji in context
 Tests knowledge of proper readings of two-character compound words, given two choices
 Tests knowledge of proper character stroke order and stroke count
 Tests ability to correctly identify and write kanji, given character reading and context

Level 9 
 Pass rate for this level: 90.1% (in 2016-17)
 Tests the 240 kanji learned up to the second grade of elementary school (age 8); see Level 9 kanji.
Specifically:
 Tests knowledge of proper readings of kanji in context
 Tests knowledge of proper character stroke order and stroke count
 Tests ability to correctly identify and write kanji, given character reading and context
 Tests knowledge of proper endings of kanji strokes (for example, whether a hook is drawn or not, and in which direction)

Level 8 
 Pass rate for this level: 84.8% (in 2016-17)
 Tests the 440 kanji learned up to the third grade of elementary school (age 9), including writing ability and the ability to use in sentences.
Specifically:
 Tests knowledge of proper readings of kanji in context
 Tests knowledge of proper character stroke order and stroke count
 Tests ability to correctly identify and write kanji, given character reading and context. This includes knowledge of antonyms, the ability to differentiate between homonyms: different kanji with the same reading, and the ability to correctly write characters when given the character radical
 Tests knowledge of okurigana

Level 7 
 Pass rate for this level: 86.3% (in 2016-17)
 Tests the 642 kanji learned up to the fourth grade of elementary school (age 10), including writing ability and the ability to use in sentences.
Specifically:
 Tests knowledge of proper readings of kanji in context. This includes knowledge of different readings of the same kanji
 Tests knowledge of proper character stroke order and stroke count
 Tests ability to distinguish between on and kun readings of characters
 Tests ability to correctly identify and write kanji, given character reading and context. This includes knowledge of antonyms, the ability to differentiate between homonyms: different kanji with the same reading, and the ability to correctly write characters when given the character radical
 Tests knowledge of okurigana
 Tests knowledge of two-character compound words

Level 6 
 Pass rate for this level: 79.2% (in 2016-17)
 Tests the 835 kanji learned up to the fifth grade of elementary school (age 11), including writing ability and the ability to use in sentences.
Specifically:
 Tests knowledge of proper readings of kanji in context
 Tests knowledge of okurigana
 Tests knowledge of character radicals and radical names
 Tests knowledge of proper character stroke order and stroke count
 Tests knowledge of two-character compound words, including the various methods by which compound words have been formed
 Tests ability to correctly identify and write kanji, given character reading and context. This includes knowledge of three-character compound words, knowledge of two-character compound antonyms and synonyms, and the ability to differentiate between homonyms: different kanji with the same reading
 Tests ability to distinguish between on and kun readings of characters in compound words (with the compound reading provided)

Level 5 
 Pass rate for this level: 72.2% (in 2016-17)
 Tests the 1026 kanji learned up to the sixth grade of elementary school (age 12) (i.e.,the kyōiku kanji), including writing ability and the ability to use in sentences.
Specifically:
 Tests knowledge of proper readings of kanji in context
 Tests knowledge of character radicals and radical names
 Tests knowledge of proper character stroke order and stroke count
 Tests knowledge of okurigana
 Tests ability to distinguish between on and kun readings of characters in compound words
 Tests knowledge of two-character compound words, including the various methods by which compound words have been formed, and the ability to identify compound words based on the word definition
 Tests ability to correctly identify and write kanji, given character reading and context. This includes knowledge of four-character compound words, knowledge of two-character compound antonyms and synonyms, and the ability to differentiate between homonyms: different kanji with the same reading

Level 4 
 Pass rate for this level: 50.1% (in 2016-17)
 Tests the kanji learned up to the sixth grade of elementary school, plus an additional 313 daily use kanji (常用漢字 jōyō kanji)
 Tests on readings and kun readings, and the ability to use kanji in sentences
 Requires the ability to read about 1300 characters, and write about 900
 Tests knowledge of synonyms and antonyms
 Tests ability to differentiate between homonyms
 Tests idiomatic phrases and four-kanji compound words
 Tests knowledge of radicals required to use a kanji dictionary

Level 3 
 Pass rate for this level: 46.8% (in 2016-17)
 Tests the kanji learned up to the sixth grade of elementary school, plus an additional 597 daily use kanji (a total of 1623 characters)
 Tests on readings and kun readings, and the ability to use kanji in sentences
 Requires the ability to read about 1600 characters
 Tests special or unusual kanji readings
 Tests ateji (当て字), phonetic readings of characters 
 Tests knowledge of synonyms and antonyms
 Tests ability to differentiate between homonyms
 Tests idiomatic phrases and four-kanji compound words
 Tests knowledge of radicals required to use a kanji dictionary

Level Pre-2 
 Pass rate for this level: 31.8% (in 2016-17)
 Tests the kanji learned up to the sixth grade of elementary school, plus an additional 925 daily use kanji (a total of 1951 characters)
 Tests on readings and kun readings, and the ability to use kanji in sentences
 Tests special or unusual kanji readings
 Tests ateji 
 Tests knowledge of synonyms and antonyms
 Tests ability to differentiate between homonyms
 Tests special compound words
 Tests complex radicals

Level 2 
 Pass rate for this level: 21.2% (in 2016-17)
 Requires the ability to read and write all of the 2136 daily use kanji (jōyō kanji)
 Tests on readings and kun readings, and the ability to use kanji in sentences
 Tests special or unusual kanji readings
 Tests ateji 
 Tests knowledge of synonyms and antonyms
 Tests ability to differentiate between homonyms
 Tests special compound words
 Tests complex radicals and composition of kanji

Level Pre-1 
 Pass rate for this level: 19.1% (in 2016-17)
 Tests the ability to read and write all 2965 kanji in level 1 of JIS X 0208, with their on readings and kun readings (jōyō kanji and jinmeiyō kanji).
 Requires the ability to use the kanji in sentences and to choose the most appropriate kanji for a given context
 Tests special or unusual kanji readings
 Tests ateji
 Tests knowledge of synonyms and antonyms
 Tests ability to differentiate between homonyms
 Tests special compound words
 Tests complex radicals
 Tests kanji unique to the Japanese language (kokuji)
 Tests knowledge of abbreviated kanji forms (ryakuji) such as 餠→餅, 摑→掴
 Tests classical Japanese proverbs and idiomatic expressions

Level 1 
 Pass rate for this level: 10.4% (in 2016-17)
 Tests the ability to read and write all kanji that have their dedicated entries in the Kanken Kanji Jiten (about 6300), with their on readings and kun readings
 Requires the ability to use the kanji in sentences and to choose the most appropriate kanji for a given context
 Tests special or unusual kanji readings
 Tests ateji
 Tests knowledge of synonyms and antonyms
 Tests ability to differentiate between homonyms
 Tests special compound words
 Tests complex radicals
 Tests kanji unique to the Japanese language
 Tests classical Japanese proverbs and idiomatic expressions
 Tests place and country names
 Tests the ability to recognize the relationship between modern and ancient or old character forms

Locations
Besides testing locations in Japan, there are testing locations in countries worldwide, including: Canada, the United States, France, Germany, Australia, Thailand, and Korea.

Certification

Certificates of passing are awarded for each level of the test, and contain such information as the test taker's name, level, year, as well as the sequential number of the test (a single digit designator for regular paper tests held 3 times a year, or two digits for computer-based tests (CBT) held with higher frequency at more than 150 testing sites across Japan).

A serial number for a paper based Kanji Kentei test consists of 11 digits, while the one for a CBT test - of 12, written in kanji characters:
2 digits for the year (taken from the last two digits of the current year according to the Gregorian calendar, i.e. 2022 -> 二二), 1 or 2 digits for the sequential number of the test, 2 digits for the level, 6 digits for the individual number).

Kanji Kentei results are accepted by some educational institutions giving applicants / students additional bonus points for admission / credits.

References

Further reading
 漢字検定 (2009).  平成２１年度 日本漢字能力検定協会 (Heisei 21 Kanji Kentei registration form and information packet).

See also

Business Japanese Proficiency Test, administered by the same organization
Chinese character
Japanese Language Proficiency Test
Japanese language education
Learning kanji
J-Test

External links
Official page  
Online kanji kentei test  
FAQ 
Test schedule 
Kanji list by level 

Japanese language tests
Testing and exams in Japan
Kanji